Sarah Hopkins Bradford (August 20, 1818 – June 25, 1912) was an American writer and historian, best known today for her two pioneering biographical books on Harriet Tubman. Most of her work consists of children's literature.

Biography

Early life and family
Sarah Elizabeth Hopkins was born on August 20, 1818, in Mount Morris, New York. She was the youngest of seven children of the Hon. Samuel Miles Hopkins (1772–1837) and Sarah Elizabeth Rogers (1778–1866). Her father was a Yale University graduate, attorney and judge, who served as a Federalist Party congressman (1813–1815), New York State Assemblyman (1820–1821), and New York State Senate member (1822). On May 15, 1839, she married prominent Albany, New York attorney (later judge) John Melancthon Bradford, Jr. (1813–1860). The couple had six children: Charles, William, Mary, John, Elizabeth and Louisa. Their two eldest sons were killed in the Civil War. Their daughter, Mary, (1844–1913) later became a well-known writer in her own right under the name Mary Bradford Crowninshield; her husband, Arent Schuyler Crowninshield, was a naval officer who advanced to Rear Admiral rank, and eventually headed the Bureau of Navigation.

Children's literature
Bradford wrote her first published work, Amy, the Glass-Blower's Daughter: A True Narrative in 1847. She then wrote the six-volume Silver Lake Series, published from 1852 to 1854. Rather than a formal series involving connected characters, these six books are each collections of poetry and prose, including many short stories. Bradford wrote these books under the pen name 'Cousin Cicely'. Most of her early writing, up until the late 1860s, targeted the children's market, and she published at least seven further children's books, including both fiction and history. She also wrote articles published in magazines.

Following her husband's death in 1860, she opened a seminary for girls and young women in Geneva, New York. She moved to Europe for eight years, where she educated her daughters.

Harriet Tubman works
In 1869, four years after the end of the Civil War, Bradford wrote her first of two groundbreaking books, Scenes in the Life of Harriet Tubman. Tubman escaped slavery and then returned to help many others escape as well; traveling to the northern United States and Canada before the Civil War, using the Underground Railroad. Bradford wrote the book, using extensive interviews with Tubman, to raise funds for Tubman's support. The two became friends. It was the first Tubman biography of any depth. Bradford was one of the first Caucasian writers to deal with African-American topics, and her work attracted worldwide fame, selling very well. In 1886, she followed up with Harriet Tubman, Moses of Her People, again to assist in supporting Tubman. Both works have been published in many editions, and still sell well in the early 21st century.

Later life and death
Bradford lived in Geneva, New York, and late in her life settled in Rochester, New York. She died there June 25, 1912.

Legacy
Bradford was one of the first American women writers to specialize in children's literature, predating better-known writers such as Louisa May Alcott. She was a contemporary of Harriet Beecher Stowe, whose breakthrough novel Uncle Tom's Cabin also featured African-American themes, but appeared some 20 years before Bradford's first Tubman biography. Much of Bradford's children's literature is still available in modern times, either online, or in through photographed copies of original volumes, reissued by modern publishers. Her Tubman books, which received some criticism based on lack of thoroughness in historical methods, remain popular, and have been issued in some twenty editions, as of 2012.

Major works

Children's literature
 Amy, the Glass-Blower's Daughter: A True Narrative, 1847, published by American Sunday-School Union, Philadelphia
 Silver Lake Series (six volumes), from 1852–1854, published by Alden, Beardsley & Co., Auburn, New York, and some also published by Wanzer, Beardsley, Rochester, New York
 The Budget: A Collection of Pieces in Prose and Rhyme
 The Jumble: A Collection of Pieces in Prose and Rhyme
 The Old Portfolio: A Collection of Pieces in Prose and Rhyme
 Green Satchel: A Collection of Pieces in Prose and Rhyme
 Ups and Downs: Or, Silver Lake Sketches
 Aunt Patty's Mirror: A Collection of Pieces in Prose and Rhyme
 Lewie; Or, The Bended Twig, 1854, published by J.C. Derby
 The Linton Family, Or, The Fashion of this World, 1860
 Getting Well: Tales for Little Convalescents, 1866
 Grandmamma's Search, 1870, published by New Editions, London

History and biography
 The History of Peter the Great, Czar of Russia, 1858, published by D. Appleton & Co., New York
 The Story of Columbus: Simplified for the Young Folks, 1862
 History and Directory of Geneva, New York, 1862
 The Chosen People, 1863
 Scenes From the Life of Harriet Tubman, 1869, published by W.J. Moses, Auburn, New York
 Harriet, the Moses of Her People, 1886, published by George R. Lockwood & Son, New York

References

External links
 Bradford, Sarah Hopkins. Harriet, the Moses of Her People. New York: Geo. R. Lockwood and Son, 1886. 
 
 
 

1818 births
1912 deaths
American children's writers
American women poets
19th-century American women writers
Children's poets
American women educators
American women short story writers
American biographers
19th-century American historians
Historians of the United States
Writers from Rochester, New York
People from Geneva, New York
American women historians
People from Mount Morris, New York
American women biographers
American women children's writers
19th-century American short story writers
19th-century American educators
Educators from New York (state)